The 2022–23 Binghamton Bearcats men's basketball team represented Binghamton University in the 2022–23 NCAA Division I men's basketball season. They played their home games at the Binghamton University Events Center in Vestal, New York, led by second-year head coach Levell Sanders.

Previous season
The Bearcats finished the 2021–22 season 12–17 overall, 8–10 in conference play to finish in sixth place. They defeated New Hampshire in the quarterfinals of the America East tournament before losing in the semifinals to Vermont.

Roster

Schedule and results

|-
!colspan=12 style=| Non-conference regular season

|-
!colspan=12 style=| America East Conference regular season

|-
!colspan=12 style=| America East tournament

References

Binghamton Bearcats men's basketball seasons
Binghamton Bearcats
2022 in sports in New York (state)
2023 in sports in New York (state)